The 2006 Grand Prix motorcycle racing season was the 58th Fédération Internationale de Motocyclisme (FIM) Road racing World Championship season. The season consisted out of 17 races for the MotoGP class and 16 for the 125cc and 250cc classes, beginning with the Spanish motorcycle Grand Prix on 26 March 2006 and ending with the Valencian Community motorcycle Grand Prix on 29 October.

Season summary

The 2006 MotoGP season was one of the closest battles in recent years, in which Honda's Nicky Hayden did not claim the championship from Valentino Rossi until the final race of the year. The victory was Hayden's first and only World Championship. Seven different riders claimed Grand Prix victories including first time winners Dani Pedrosa, Toni Elías and Troy Bayliss. Yamaha's Valentino Rossi fought back from a 51-point deficit to lead the championship going into the final rounds. Hayden's fortunes took a dip when he was taken out by his teammate Pedrosa at the penultimate round in Portugal, but he bounced back to win the crown when Rossi crashed in the final race at Valencia. Hayden only won two races to Rossi's five, but the Yamaha suffered a number of mechanical issues that led to more retirements, which allowed Hayden to score more podiums. In addition, the surprise win of Elias in Portugal, with a margin of just 0.002 second over Rossi, proved to be a major decider in the championship. Rossi had given up five points in that round, the same amount by which he was behind Hayden in the final standings. Had there been a tie, Rossi would have been crowned World Champion due to more race victories than Hayden.

In the 250cc class, Aprilia's Jorge Lorenzo won his first championship taking 8 victories. Another Aprilia rider took the 125cc crown with Álvaro Bautista also taking 8 wins.

2006 Grand Prix season calendar
The following Grands Prix were scheduled to take place in 2006:

 † = MotoGP class only
 †† = Saturday race

Calendar changes
 The Qatar Grand Prix was moved forward, from 1 October to 8 April.
 The Turkish Grand Prix was moved forward, from 23 October to 30 April.
 Only the MotoGP class raced during the United States Grand Prix because of a Californian law on air pollution, preventing the 125 and 250cc classes from racing.
 The Portuguese Grand Prix was moved back, from 17 April to 15 October.

Regulation changes
The following changes are made to the regulation for the 2006 season:

Sporting regulations

 The rule regarding the interruption of a race via a red flag has been reformed. From the moment the red flag is shown, riders who are not competing actively in the race will not be classified. Once five minutes have passed since the showing of the red flag, all riders who have not reached the pits on board their motorcycles will not be classified.
 Rules for licenses have been updated. All Chief Medial Officers (CMO) and Deputy Chief Medical Officers must now be in possession of a license. The license will be valid for a span of three years and be handed out by the FIM. 
Criteria and procedure for the obtainment of a CMO license has been updates. Potential candidates should apply via a letter through their FMN to the FIM including their professional and motorsport CV, as well as evidence that the following criteria has been fulfilled:
 Be a fully registered and qualified medical practitioner.
 Be experienced in the supply of Emergency Medical Care.
 Be experienced at motorcycle events and must have been to at least five national events as CMO or Deputy CMO with a confirmation by their FMN.
 Have attended and successfully completed a FIM CMO seminar and have taken part in at least one FIM event within the previous two years.
 In the 125cc and 250cc classes, rookie riders will now be allowed to compete in other held at circuit in Europe during a season.

These rules were additionally added on 27 June 2006:

 Practice restrictions have been put in place for the 125cc and 250cc classes. Contracted teams who profit from a Participation Agreement to participate in the 125cc and 250cc class championships are forbidden to practice with their bikes at any circuit between the 1st of December of one year and the 20th of January of the next year, both dates being inclusive.

Technical regulations

 A change has been made regarding fuel tank regulations. In all classes, fuel tanks made out of non-metallic composite materials must be fitted with a fuel cell bladder or have otherwise passed the appropriate FIM test standards.

2006 Grand Prix season results

 † = MotoGP class only
 †† = Saturday Race

Participants

MotoGP participants

250cc participants
According to the official website: www.motogp.com

125cc participants
According to the official website: www.motogp.com

Standings

MotoGP riders' standings
Scoring system
Points were awarded to the top fifteen finishers. A rider had to finish the race to earn points.

 Rounds marked with a light blue background were under wet race conditions or stopped by rain.
 Riders marked with light blue background were eligible for Rookie of the Year awards.

250cc riders' standings

Scoring system
Points were awarded to the top fifteen finishers. A rider had to finish the race to earn points.

 Rounds marked with a light blue background were under wet race conditions or stopped by rain.
 Riders marked with light blue background were eligible for Rookie of the Year awards.

125cc riders' standings
Scoring system
Points were awarded to the top fifteen finishers. A rider had to finish the race to earn points.

 Rounds marked with a light blue background were under wet race conditions or stopped by rain.
 Riders marked with light blue background were eligible for Rookie of the Year awards.

Constructors' standings
Scoring system
Points were awarded to the top fifteen finishers. A rider had to finish the race to earn points.
 

 Each constructor gets the same number of points as their best placed rider in each race.
 Rounds marked with a light blue background were under wet race conditions or stopped by rain.

MotoGP

250cc

125cc

Teams' standings
 Each team gets the total points scored by their two riders, including replacement riders. In one rider team, only the points scored by that rider will be counted. Wildcard riders do not score points.
 Rounds marked with a light blue background were under wet race conditions or stopped by rain.

MotoGP

References

 

 Grand
Grand Prix motorcycle racing seasons
2006 in motorcycle sport